Eleven expansion packs were released for the 2009 life simulation video game The Sims 3, the third major title in The Sims series. Of the eleven expansion packs, seven were developed by Maxis Redwood Shores, while the other four were developed by EA Salt Lake. All expansion packs were published by Electronic Arts. Expansion packs tend to focus on major new features, with the addition of many new objects, worlds, and game features geared towards the pack's major theme. The first expansion pack, World Adventures, was released on November 18, 2009. The last expansion pack, Into the Future, was released on October 22, 2013.

World Adventures 

The Sims 3: World Adventures is the first expansion pack for The Sims 3, announced on August 3, 2009, and released in North America on November 18, 2009.

The pack focuses on traveling to various areas in a manner similar to previous expansions The Sims: Vacation and The Sims 2: Bon Voyage. Sims are able to travel to fictional locations set in France, China, and Egypt. At these locations, Sims are able to go on adventures to earn rewards. Sims are also able to level up in new skills: photography, martial arts, and nectar making. The expansion also added a new life state, the mummy, which can be added to a household through several means.

Gameplay 
The main feature in World Adventures is the ability to travel to three new destinations. Sims can only stay at destinations for limited durations based on their combined visa levels. Having more visa points unlock new levels. Having higher visa level, in addition to lifetime rewards and certificates of partnership with specific destinations, will extend the duration Sims can stay in a destination, from three days to a maximum of 18 days for a single Sim, and up to 72 days for a household.

Destinations 
Sims can travel to three fictional destinations set in real-life locations. In these destinations, Sims can meet with the locals, form new friendships, and go on adventures. Each destination has a unique skill associated with it. The three destinations are:

 Al Simhara, Egypt – This destination sells the best cameras in the pack, and is hence the main location for the new Photography skill. This destination also features the most challenging tomb adventures in the game, because of the mummies inside which can put deadly curses on Sims.
 Champs Les Sims, France – Sims can learn the Nectar Making skill, based on winemaking, enabling Sims to brew drinks, which give Sims positive moodlets when consumed.
 Shang Simla, China – Sims can learn the new Martial Arts skill, which works in tandem with the existing Athletic skill to improve a Sim's fighting ability.

Adventures 
In each destination, there is an adventure board outside the base camp. Sims can pick Adventures to fulfill, similar to opportunities in the base game. Adventures can consist of a simple goal such as collecting a certain material and returning it to the quest giver, or a more complex one, such as exploring one of the expansion's many tombs. Sims earn visa points, ancient coins, and Simoleons from completing these tasks.

Every destination also has a general store for purchasing adventuring supplies. New items include dried food, shower-in-a-can, and a variety of different quality tents. These new items are required for sleeping and surviving in dungeons when fulfilling Adventures.

Dungeons 
Inside dungeons, Sims will encounter traps, puzzles and the new mummy creature. Most dungeons are fairly linear though some are larger than others and feature more items. Ancient coins and relics can also be found in dungeons. These collectibles can be sold, or displayed as a collection. Many relics can be sold for large amounts of Simoleons, making it a viable way to make money in the game.

Skills 
Martial Arts – Learned in Shang Simla. This skill lets Sims become powerful fighters, and is helpful for defeating mummies in Al Simhara. The skill also enables Sims to meditate, giving a meditative focus moodlet. This moodlet boosts skill gains and increase the quality of crafted goods. Sims who master meditation can learn to teleport.

Nectar Making – Learned in Champs Les Sims. Nectar can be aged, and can be highly profitable if the bottles are aged enough.

Photography – Primarily in Al Simhara. While Sims can buy a cheap camera in any location, there are two high end camera models that are only available in Al Simhara's general store. Sims can capture subjects with these cameras, and photos can be sold for small amounts of money.

Development 
Producer Lyndsay Pearson said that real-world locations were a draw for their players, and that users had been creating famous buildings on the online Exchange; the pack represented an extension of that desire. Pearson also stated that there were innovations present in the pack, that could not have been achieved in Sims titles before.

Music 
The score to World Adventures was composed by Steve Jablonsky, who had previously composed the score to The Sims 3. He recorded his score with a 35-piece string and woodwind ensemble at Eastwest Studios in Hollywood.

Nelly Furtado, Pixie Lott, Stefanie Heinzmann, Matt & Kim, The Young Punx and other artists contributed songs in Simlish for the pack.

Reception 
Early reception of World Adventures was positive, earning a Metacritic rating of 81.

GamePro argued the pack's only bad feature was being able to make players lose several hours in the addictive gameplay. IGN's Steve Butts criticized the adventure-based gameplay and the difficulty of having family vacations, however, he concluded, "I hope World Adventures sets the pattern for future Sims expansions."

World Adventures was listed as seventh in a list of the top ten selling PC games (expansion pack) of 2009, according to NPD sales charts. The Sims 3 was listed as the highest selling game of 2009.

Ambitions 

The Sims 3: Ambitions is the second expansion pack for The Sims 3, released in North America on June 1, 2010. Ambitions introduces new professions that can be actively controlled by the player, unlike the careers in the base game. A variety of new skills are also added alongside the ability to register as self employed for skills. The expansion also added a new world, Twinbrook.

Gameplay 
Professions are the main focus of Ambitions, and allows players to be more interactive with a Sim's job. The new careers are:

 Architect – The Architectural Design profession will send Sims on jobs to redecorate other Sims' homes. Client jobs include remodeling and building new rooms based on their traits and requirements, based on a set budget. This gameplay takes place in a modified version of the base game's Build and Buy mode.
 Doctor – The Doctor profession is an updated version of the Medical career track from the base game. Sims now have the option of leaving the hospital during work hours to do tasks, such as vaccinations and clinic duty.
 Firefighter – This profession involves rescuing Sims and putting out fires.
 Ghost Hunter – This profession involves jobs to eliminate paranormal activity from Sims' homes, in a similar fashion to Ghostbusters and Luigi's Mansion. The three types of paranormal activity are Spirits, Poltergeists, and Ghost Sims. Sims get a zapper gun, and can collect certain types of Spirits to sell for extra money.
 Inventor – This is a self-employment profession, to be used with the new inventing skill. Sims can invent gadgets, decorations, and toys from collected scrap. Scrap can be collected from the new junkyard lot, or by detonating objects at higher skill levels. Sims at level 10 of the inventing skill can build a SimBot, a new life state similar to the Servos from The Sims 2: Open for Business.
 Private Investigator – This profession involves looking for clues to solve investigative cases.
 Sculptor – This is also a self-employment profession, to be used with the new sculpting skill. Sims can sculpt different item types, such as toilets to statues. Sculpted furniture can even be used with the Architectural Design profession. Objects can be sculpted out of clay, wood, stone and ice.
 Stylist – This profession involves changing the looks of Sims in the neighborhood. Sims can do full makeovers and wardrobe changes, subject to the clients' needs. This profession is used with the stylist hidden skill.
 Teacher – The Education career track is not a profession, and is a standard career similar to the base game careers.
 Self-Employed – Sims who pursue a skill as their primary method of earning money can now register as self employed. Sims can register at City Hall with a minimum of one skill point. Sims earn money in the form of bonuses, and accomplishing set goals with rewards like decorative plaques and trophies.

Development 
Associate producer Grant Rodiek explained that career-based gameplay was something that the team had always wanted to do. "We always strive to do something new that hasn't been seen in The Sims before." Rodiek explained the main focus of an expansion pack relied on three elements: community feedback, what the development team wants to do and software limitations.

Reception 
Anthony Gallegos of IGN have said that "it doesn't reinvent the series but it's much more substantial than many other Sims expansions." GameSpots Kevin VanOrd on the other hand, called it "a thoughtful and delightful expansion, [that is] full of wit and character." Dan Stapleton of PC Gamer gave the game an 85 out of 100, praising its new additions and careers. Tracy Erickson of Pocket Gamer reviewed the iPhone version of the game, giving it 7 out of 10 and praising the customization system, addition of babies and easiness when it comes to cooking.

Late Night 

The Sims 3: Late Night is the third expansion pack for The Sims 3, announced on July 20, 2010, and released in North America on October 26, 2010. and is similar to The Sims 2: Nightlife and The Sims: Hot Date, as well as incorporating elements from The Sims: Superstar and The Urbz: Sims in the City.

The pack introduces a brand new city neighborhood named Bridgeport, loosely based on New York City, which is divided into an urban downtown area, a less dense uptown area, and a hilly, affluent suburb.

Gameplay 
Late Night adds a celebrity system, based on five stars representing a Sim's level of fame. Celebrity status can be gained through a variety of methods, including through careers added by the expansion and present in the base game. Celebrities can get discounts or free food, fan mail and gifts from obsessed fans, and admission to exclusive venues.

In Late Night, Sims can go out to the downtown area of the brand new world, Bridgeport. The downtown area includes many hangouts and bars, including several new community lot types added with Late Night. Some community lots require certain celebrity levels to enter.

The expansion also added a new life state, vampires. Vampires abilities include increased skill learning speed, the ability to read other Sims' minds to find out their traits and relationship status, and the ability to run faster than ordinary Sims. Bridgeport comes with several premade vampire families. To become a vampire, a Sim must befriend one and ask them to turn them into a vampire. Vampires are also included and expanded on in Supernatural, which added the ability to create a vampire in Create-a-Sim.

Sims can also learn the Mixology skill, which allows them to mix drinks at the new professional bar object. These professional bars are available in Buy Mode.

Bridgeport 
Bridgeport is the first urban city of its kind in The Sims series, as most past neighbourhoods were either towns or suburbs. Bridgeport is designed to focus on late night activities, and is similar in many respects to the Downtown sub-neighborhoods introduced in The Sims: Hot Date and The Sims 2: Nightlife. Bridgeport is a metropolitan city loosely based on New York City and other major cities in the US.

Bridgeport includes high rises and penthouse lofts, and is made of multiple islands connected by bridges. Sims are able to both drive and walk over these bridges. Sims can also use a subway system, added in Late Night.

Bridgeport is divided into two main areas: an urban city center and a suburban area with luxury mansions. Bridgeport Sims are richer on average than Sims in other The Sims 3 worlds. Bridgeport families usually start with around $5000, and there are several rich families with large houses.

Careers 
Late Night adds the film career, which puts an emphasis on the new Celebrity mechanic, as it is a factor that influences job performance. Sims in the film career go to work at the new rabbit hole: Film studio, but are also able to do other career-related tasks around the neighborhood, much like the Medical career, or the careers added in Ambitions.

Some of these tasks include promoting movies at bars and picking up food for shoots. Sims in the film careers can win awards, similar to The Sims: Superstar. Sims in the career can also write movie scripts. Sims can become a celebrity by befriending celebrities or impressing them by talking about their job, wealth, name dropping, or simply making things up.

Spouses and offspring of celebrities may inherit celebrity levels. Celebrities are granted access to better clubs and VIP lounges, are given discounts and free drinks or food at the club. Celebrities are also invited to hang out at exclusive parties with other celebrities. Celebrities may be stalked by the paparazzi and admiring fans, who will ask for their autograph.

Generations 

The Sims 3: Generations is the fourth expansion pack for The Sims 3, announced on April 5, 2011, and released in North America on May 31, 2011.

Gameplay 
In Generations, each life phase has a theme. For children, imagination is the  theme. For teens, rebellious, chaotic scenes such as parties while parents are out on vacation and pranks are an addition. As a young adult or an adult, the focus is on their relationships with others; from marriage to having children of their own. Elders get to enjoy their time reminiscing about the golden years and the joys of watching their grandchildren grow up.

Players can now add body hair to males in Create-a-Sim. Two new traits come with Generations. The first is the rebellious trait, while the second is the nurturing trait. Sims with the rebellious trait can make trouble pulling off various pranks, such as doorbell ditching, adding hair dye to their sibling's shampoo, and making the toilet explode. Sims with the nurturing trait are better at taking care of kids and can punish naughty Sims by giving them timeouts, banning video games, and grounding them. The player can now enroll child Sims in afterschool activities. The two available for children are ballet and scouts. Teenagers can join up to two High School clubs including the sports team, drama club, debate team, school band, and student newspaper.

Soundtrack 
All Time Low has contributed their song "Time Bomb" off of their fourth album Dirty Work to the pack, and was featured in the pack's announcement trailer and in-game radio. Portugal. The Man have also contributed the song "Everything You See (Kids Count Hallelujahs)" from their sixth studio album In The Mountain In The Cloud.

Pets 

The Sims 3: Pets is the fifth expansion pack for The Sims 3 on Microsoft Windows and macOS, as well as a standalone title on PlayStation 3, Xbox 360 and Nintendo 3DS. It was released on all platforms in North America on October 18, 2011. The pack re-introduces pets such as cats and dogs. The PC/Mac expansion pack additionally adds horses, a first for the series. It serves as the spiritual successor to The Sims 2: Pets and The Sims: Unleashed.

Development 
Pets focuses on adding animals to the game. The player creates their pet in a similar fashion to the existing Create-a-Sim feature. The Create-a-Pet feature allows the player to customize their pets in various ways, including selecting a breed and a set of traits for their pets.

Unlike The Sims 2: Pets and The Sims: Unleashed, the player can now directly control pets. Included in the pack is a new town, Appaloosa Plains. The pre-order only limited edition (excluding PAL versions) of Pets additionally includes a pet store.

On June 8, 2011, producer Ben Bell gave a presentation and demonstration previewing Pets that was streamed over EA's website. The demonstration contained parts of the game that had never been seen before by the public. Christopher Lennertz provided the original score for Pets.

Gameplay

Pets 
In Pets, players can create and customize pets in Create-a-Pet mode. Players can customize the pet's coat, shape, pattern, and color, as well as body parts like ears, tail, snout and eyes. A pet's behavior patterns and traits are also fully customizable. Players can also put different layers on the body of their pets, such as dots and/or stripes. Players are able to choose three traits for their pets. Players can also add markings on their fur and slide them around on the pets' bodies. A player can have up to six pets in one household, extending the maximum amount of Sims in a household from eight to ten.

Cats and dogs can be obtained when created with a new household, or adopted by computer or phone by an existing household. Sims who are giving them away will also put an advertisement in the newspaper. Sims will occasionally encounter stray cats and dogs, which can be befriended and adopted by the player. Breed has no effect on gameplay. The reinforcement social system is used to correct bad behaviors and to praise good ones. Getting by with no punishment for bad behavior can lead a pet to take on that trait.

When grown up, adult dogs can learn tricks, guard the house, hunt for objects and can be taught tricks. Cats can learn how to hunt using a toy from the animal toy box, unlike dogs, they can not be taught to hunt by their owners. Cats can hunt small pets. Unlike dogs, they cannot sniff out gems, bones, or metals, but have the ability to fish.

Horses are a new species of pet that is only introduced in the PC/Mac versions of Pets, and are not available in the console games. Horses can be created with the household, adopted using a computer or phone, or bought from the Equestrian Center. Horses can learn two skills – racing and jumping. Wild horses appear in herds in home neighborhoods. Wild horses can be befriended; it's easier to befriend them if the Sim has a high (hidden) Wildlife skill. Horses and unicorns can breed together, with a chance of the offspring also being a unicorn. Unlike cats or dogs in the game, horses can be sold. The higher the horse's skills and the more money they have earned racing, the larger amount of money they can be sold for. Also, horses can be bred at the Equestrian Center.

At night, there are unicorns which appear and can be interacted with and adopted. Unicorns can set things on fire, teleport, curse or bless Sims.

The player can also adopt small pets, such as birds or snakes. There are raccoons which tip over dustbins and deers, which can only be watched or pet.

World 
Appaloosa Plains is the name of the new town in the PC/Mac versions of Pets, named after the Appaloosa breed of horse. The new location is set in a Midwestern United States ranching town nestled between lush green hills.

Reception 
Upon release in North America, The PC/Mac versions of Pets got positive reviews, with IGN rating the game 7.5/10. The console version (360, PS3), also getting a similar score, with IGN giving it a rating of 7/10.

There has also been some issues regarding user-created mods that stopped working properly on the pack. This has been attributed to the developers switching to an in-house animation engine from the proprietary Granny 3D toolkit that they used in the earlier versions of The Sims 3. There are also some problems regarding glitches in the game. Some reported are, problems creating a pet, problems involving graphics, and frequent crashing.

Showtime 

The Sims 3: Showtime is the sixth expansion pack for The Sims 3, released in North America on March 6, 2012. A limited Collector's Edition includes exclusive in-game content such as a stage and two costumes, along with a poster based on American singer Katy Perry.

Gameplay 
Starlight Shores is a new world that is included in Showtime, loosely based on Downtown Los Angeles. It has a park, a coffee house, and show venues in which Sims can perform. There is also a beach with houses along the coastline. SimFests are held in Starlight Shores. These allow singers, acrobats, and magicians to compete in front of an audience.

The new SimPort feature allows players to send Star performers on tour to perform special shows in other players' towns.  Players can customize the stage in venues with special themed backgrounds, props, lights, and special effects. Players can throw objects at performers – ranging from flowers to lettuce. A player can unlock backgrounds, props, and costumes for their Sim if they choose to use SimPort. Sims who visit a player's town via SimPort will default to the traits, clothes, and objects that they have locally in their game. Players can message other players while their Sims are performing in other towns. Showtime comes in three editions: the regular, the Limited Edition, and the Katy Perry edition.

Players will be able to set up their own stage when their magicians, acrobats, and singers perform at a venue. The set up stage option appears up to two hours prior to a live show and will prompt buy mode's "Props" section. Players will have a variety of items to choose from and to be able to choose a "Previously Saved" prop default, or create a brand new one. There is also the option to use the venue's pre-set prop stage. Props serve as home decor and furniture as well. Lighting effects, flames, butterflies, and other effects are also available as props. When a Sim has finished performing, they will get reviews on their performances. Sims can have anywhere from awesome to terrible shows. Moodlets reflect their performances.

Showtime also includes numerous new objects, such as: pool tables, karaoke machines, DJ booths, microphones, spotlights, speaker systems, pull up bars, jukeboxes, an electro-dance sphere, domino table, photo booth, a golf driving range, portable MP3 players, and new lighting. Showtime includes new clothing and hairstyles, as well as new stage props and statues to use on stages.

Release 
A pre-order exclusive limited edition of Showtime includes an exclusive Ultimate Stage performance venue. A deluxe Katy Perry edition, subtitled Katy Perry Collector's Edition, includes Katy Perry themed objects, hair styles, costumes, fruit-themed stage prop and venue, based on the concept from her third studio album Teenage Dream. The Collector's Edition also includes the Ultimate Stage venue and a poster. This was followed by the release of the Katy Perry's Sweet Treats stuff pack in June.

Supernatural 

The Sims 3: Supernatural is the seventh expansion pack for The Sims 3, released in North America on September 4, 2012.

Gameplay 
Players can create supernatural (non-human) Sims such as witches, wizards, werewolves, zombies, vampires (updated), ghosts (in which they may choose how the Sim "died"), fairies and Genies (if Showtime is installed). Each have their own magical abilities, traits, and interactions. Supernatural comes with a new world called Moonlight Falls. Sims can learn the new alchemy skill which teaches Sims how to brew different potions and elixirs with certain ingredients. Sims also learn new spells which can be used to either charm or hex other Sims. New objects include a broomstick, a gypsy caravan, a magic mirror and a sliding bookcase door. Most of the objects have a gothic theme. Bonehilda, a skeleton non-player character, returns from The Sims: Makin' Magic. Sims can also turn into zombies using a zombification potion. The six new traits included are Supernatural Skeptic, Supernatural Fan, Night Owl, Brooding, Gatherer and Proper.

Release 
A pre-order exclusive Limited Edition of Supernatural includes exclusive items from the game Plants vs. Zombies; a peashooter, a ripped zombie suit outfit, a newspaper suit zombie outfit, and cone and bucket hats. Players who pre-ordered via Origin further received an exclusive Origin Plants Vs. Zombies set that included a plantern lamp, a wall-nut sculpture, a zombie gnome sculpture, and a brains flag sculpture. Players who registered their game received a Plants Vs. Zombies poster and T-shirt from The Sims 3 Store.

Reception 
Jon Michael of IGN gave the game 4.5 out of 10 criticizing the repetitive additions and useless spells in the game, as well as a bug that will let the zombies appear every night in the game if the player will save it at night. Leif Johnson of GameSpot on the other hand, praised the expansion for its new career and skills.

Seasons 

The Sims 3: Seasons is the eighth expansion pack for The Sims 3, released in North America on November 13, 2012. Like Generations, Seasons does not come with a new world.

Gameplay

Weather 
There are five types of weather such as Rain/Lightning, Sunny, Hail, Snow, and Fog. There are varying degrees of rain. Sims can splash and jump in puddles for a boost to the fun need, which can help put out fires in their town or water their plants. It can rain at any time of the year, but the amount of rain will vary by season. Most of the rain will occur in the springtime. When there are storms, lightning, and thunder will occur.

There are new transformative weather effects in the expansion, including wind. The sky can be an indicator of any upcoming weather; for example, clouds will get darker, which means the storm is approaching. Gardening can be affected by the weather. Snow and rain will gather on roadways. Cars will not slip off the road. Temperature will control how easily snow will accumulate on the ground or trees, or how quickly waters such as puddles will evaporate. Sims can rake leaves during Fall.

Additional features 
Aliens are also added in Seasons, and have more capabilities than the ones from The Sims 2. They have brain powers allow them to control other Sims as servant and read other Sims traits. Aliens can also ride their UFO and abduct Sims or adventure through space.

There is a new feature that will allow players to change the appearance of lots throughout the year called "Seasonal Lot Marker". Players can set up different objects and decorations for every season, but cannot make build mode changes like walls or roofing. It is the key to the shifting seasonal festivals, but it also functions on community and residential lots.

Seasons adds new clothes like snow gear, swimwear, and raincoats. It adds filters in Create-a-Sim, which allow the player to find clothing from a certain expansion or stuff pack. Clothing from the base game, expansions, stuff packs, and the store will be updated to be selectable as outerwear.

There are four holidays in Seasons, such as Love Day, Leisure Day, Spooky Day, and Snowflake Day. All holidays take place on the last Thursday of every season. If there is no Thursday, it will take place on the last day of the season.

Lots will transform with different objects and decorations throughout the year according to current seasons, holidays, and festivals. There is a festival held in each season. Festival lots usually replace the main park of the world. Players have full control over the appearance of the festival lots, and can build their own lots that change throughout the year.

A pre-order exclusive limited edition of Seasons includes the Ice Lounge community lot, with ice-themed items like a bar, bar stool, pub table, and other build items.

Reception 
Seasons received "mixed or average" reception according to aggregator Metacritic, which gave the game a rating of 73 out of 100 based on 12 reviews.

Destructoid gave the game a "mediocre" score of 5 out of 10, citing a lack of new careers and public lots. Jon Michael from IGN gave the game a 7.5 rating out of 10 and believes "[The game is] a solid gateway expansion that builds on the rules without overwhelming you, but still adds enough variety that you'll never want to play without it." Amanda "StormyDawn" Hale from Worthplaying.com gave the game an 8.7/10 and claimed even though it isn't a large expansion pack, it is one that it is important for any Sims collection – "It's not the biggest expansion for Sims 3...[but] it may just be the most important."

University Life 

The Sims 3: University Life is the ninth expansion pack for The Sims 3, released in North America on March 5, 2013, coinciding with the release of another Maxis title, SimCity. It is the spiritual successor to The Sims 2: University.

Gameplay 
Sims University is a sub-neighborhood that functions similarly to the vacation worlds in World Adventures. In order to attend university, a Sim must be a young adult, adult or elder. When a non-player mascot is near the Sims' lots, they can take an aptitude test. The results will depend on their skills, traits, work experience and school grades. The results also show the total aptitude score. The amount of financial assistance (scholarship) provided to the Sim is also determined by the test. Teen can also take the aptitude test, to see what skills they need to work on but they can not go to University before they grow up to be a young adult.

Enrolling in college can be done on phone, computer, or going to the public school and enrolling there. The player can select the Sim's major, out of either Business, Communications, Fine Arts, Physical Education, Science and Medicine, or Technology, as well as the number of credits they wish to study for, and whether they want to study for one or two terms. Taking more credits will allow a Sim to obtain their degree faster, but they will have more of their time taken up by studying.

To receive a degree, a Sim must obtain 48 credits for it, and pass their final exams. Having a degree will allow a Sim to start at a higher level in careers relevant to the degree, and they will also be paid more. These benefits will increase the higher the Sim's grade.

University Life also introduces social groups: Jocks, Nerds and Rebels. The player can join these social groups, and move up in their rankings by befriending members of the group and/or doing activities and interactions related to the group. As they progress through the ranks they can unlock new interactions and objects, and later pick an additional trait. A Sim who reaches rank 10 with a group will be given a job offer in a special career unique to that group.

Release 

The pre-order exclusive limited edition of the game includes the party pack bundle with togas, laurel wreaths, masquerade masks and the Partaeus Maximus statue.

Island Paradise 

The Sims 3: Island Paradise is the tenth expansion pack for The Sims 3, released in North America on June 25, 2013. Island Paradise is a vacation and adventure-themed expansion, similar to The Sims: Vacation, The Sims 2: Bon Voyage, and World Adventures.

Gameplay 
Isla Paradiso is the new world that comes with the pack, loosely based on the Caribbean. "Isla" is Spanish for "island" and "Paradiso" is Italian for "paradise". The world has various types of islands that vary in size and are both inhabited and uncharted, which can be found and explored by Sims. There are also pre-made resorts that can be edited and managed by Sims.

Island Paradise introduces houseboats for Sims to live in. These can be docked at any unoccupied port, or anchored anywhere in the ocean, and the player can have a Sim drive the boat wherever they want, as well as retain control of the other Sims in the household as the boat moves. Houseboats function the same way as other lots; services (newspaper delivery, mail, etc.) will use speedboats and jet skis to access them.

The pack also introduces the Scuba diving skill, which will allow Sims to dive underwater at certain points on the map. Whilst diving, Sims can catch fish, explore underwater caves, find sunken treasure, as well as use a limited set of social interactions.

Island Paradise introduces the Lifeguard career. Lifeguards are dispatched to a random beach during their work hours, and will have to survey the ocean, rescue Sims who are drowning, and perform CPR demonstrations.

Sims can now own and manage resorts, that will provide a daily cash income based on the net profit they make. The player can increase the amount of money they get by increasing the guest capacity, as well as providing amenities (fitness equipment, swimming pools, buffet tables, etc.) for guests, in order to increase the resort's rating and allow the hotel to charge higher prices. The player can also manage resort staff, hiring workers and choosing their uniforms.

Mermaids are the new life state introduced in Island Paradise. Sims can encounter them while diving, and later summon them onto land. Mermaid Sims can breathe underwater, are immune to decompression, and all young adult mermaids have a maximum diving skill. If a mermaid spends too much time out of the ocean however, they will become a normal Sim.

Development and release 
Island Paradise was announced during a live broadcast on January 8, 2013, where a full line up of upcoming expansion packs and stuff packs of the 2013 year were revealed. Several live broadcasts were later presented and each demonstrated new features, such houseboats, resort system, underwater diving and hidden islands.

The pre-order exclusive limited edition of Island Paradise includes the Island Survival Pack, which includes survival-themed decor, furniture and clothing.

Reception 
The Game Scouts gave the pack a positive score of 9 out of 10, saying: "Island Paradise arrives ideally at the start of Summer. The pack integrates excellently with other expansions like Seasons. While at first glance it may seem like a targeted release, it's all-encompassing in its reach and offers something for every player."

Giancarlo Saldana from Games Radar remained positive and praised the overall experience of the game even though he believed the underwater feature is a disappointment, as there are only limited diving spots: "Though [the] underwater sections are lacking, the rest of Island Paradise is a great display of what The Sims 3 can still offer fans." But he states that the new features are a real highlight for the overall series: "...the features it brings to the table are definitely some of the best the series has seen."

Into the Future 

The Sims 3: Into the Future is the eleventh and final expansion pack for The Sims 3, released on October 22, 2013, in North America.

Gameplay 
The pack is futuristic-themed. Upon installation, players are visited by a time-traveler called Emit Relevart (whose name is "Time Traveler" backwards, as well as a reference to Emmett "Doc" Brown from Back to the Future) in their home neighborhood. Emit gives Sims access to a time machine. Using this portal, Sims can travel to the future into a new sub-neighborhood called Oasis Landing, a futuristic town built amongst mountainous wastelands.

The pack also adds Plumbots, similar to Servos in The Sims 2: Open for Business and SimBots in Ambitions. They can be built and fully customized with the new Create-a-Bot mode. Players can create various trait chips that determine their personality, use and gameplay. Hoverboards, jetpacks, monorails, and hovercars are introduced to the game as new transportation options. New careers include astronomers and bot dealers. New objects include holographic TVs, a hoverboard, a food synthesizer, build-a-bot workshops, and the laser rhythm-a-con, a new instrument.

Sims are also able to visit their future descendants during time travel, and can change or eliminate these descendants altogether if the player sends the Sim back to the present and changes their lifestyle or fate.

Development 
On January 8, 2013, it was revealed on a live broadcast that a futuristic-themed expansion pack was in early stages of development, alongside the announcement of Island Paradise.

The pre-order exclusive limited edition of Into the Future includes the Quantum Power Pack content, which adds a hibernation chamber and multi-function power suit.

References 

2009 video games
The Sims 3 expansion packs
Electronic Arts games
MacOS games
Video games featuring protagonists of selectable gender
Windows games
Life simulation games
Social simulation video games
Video games developed in the United States